The 1999 Fordham Rams football team was an American football team that represented Fordham University during the 1999 NCAA Division I-AA football season. Fordham lost every game and finished last in the Patriot League. 

In their first year under head coach Dave Clawson, the Rams compiled an 0–11 record. Jon Piela and Jim Walls were the team captains.

The Rams were outscored 410 to 170. Their winless (0–6) conference record placed last in the seven-team Patriot League standings. 

Fordham played its home games at Jack Coffey Field on the university campus in The Bronx, in New York City.

Schedule

References

College football winless seasons
Fordham
Fordham Rams football seasons
Fordham Rams football